Quo Vadis is a 2001 Polish film directed by Jerzy Kawalerowicz based on the 1896 book of the same title by Henryk Sienkiewicz. It was Poland's submission to the 74th Academy Awards for the Academy Award for Best Foreign Language Film, but was not nominated.

Plot
The central plot in the movie revolves around the love of a Roman patrician, Marcus Vinicius, towards a Christian girl (coming from the territory of modern-day Poland) set against the backdrop of the persecutions against Christians during the reign of Nero.

In the beginning, Lygia, a Christian and hostage of Rome, becomes the object of Vinicius' love but she refuses his advances. Vinicius' friend Petronius tries to manipulate Nero, who has authority over all Roman hostages, to give Lygia to Vinicius, but Lygia is taken into hiding by Christians. Marcus Vinicius decides to find her and force her to be his wife. He goes to a Christian meeting along with Croton, a gladiator, to find her. After following her from the meeting, Marcus tries to take her, but Ursus, a strong man and friend of Lygia, kills Croton. Marcus himself is wounded in the fight, but is taken care of by Lygia and the Christians. Seeing their kindness he begins to convert to Christianity, and Lygia accepts him.

Rome catches fire while the emperor, Nero, is away. Nero returns and sings to the crowd, but they become angry. At the suggestion of Nero's wife, the Christians are blamed for the fire, providing a long series of cruel spectacles to appease the crowd. In one of the spectacles, Ursus faces a bull carrying Lygia on its back. Ursus wins and, with the crowd and guards in approval, Nero lets them live.

Nero kills himself, and Vinicius and Lygia leave Rome.

Cast
 Paweł Deląg – Marcus Vinicius
 Magdalena Mielcarz – Lygie Callina
 Bogusław Linda – Petronius
 Michał Bajor – Nero
 Agnieszka Wagner - Poppaea Sabina
 Jerzy Trela – Chilon Chilonides
 Danuta Stenka – Pomponia Graecina
 Franciszek Pieczka – Saint Peter
 Krzysztof Majchrzak – Tigellinus
 Rafał Kubacki – Ursus

Reception
It was the most popular Polish film of the year with 4.2 million admissions.

See also 
 Cinema of Poland
 List of submissions to the 74th Academy Awards for Best Foreign Language Film

References

External links
 
 
 

2001 films
2000s Polish-language films
2000s historical drama films
Cultural depictions of Poppaea Sabina
Films based on works by Henryk Sienkiewicz
Films directed by Jerzy Kawalerowicz
Films scored by Jan A. P. Kaczmarek
Films set in classical antiquity
Films set in the Roman Empire
Films set in the 1st century
Polish historical drama films
Depictions of Nero on film
Films about Christianity
2001 drama films
Cultural depictions of Saint Peter